A suspended sentence is a sentence on conviction for a criminal offence, the serving of which the court orders to be deferred in order to allow the defendant to perform a period of probation. If the defendant does not break the law during that period and fulfills the particular conditions of the probation, the sentence is usually considered fulfilled. If the defendant commits another offence or breaks the terms of probation, the court can order the sentence to be served, in addition to any sentence for the new offence.

Australia

In Australia, suspended sentences are commonly imposed in order to alleviate the strain on overcrowded prisons. For example, an individual may be sentenced to a six-month jail term, wholly suspended for six months; if they commit any other offence during that year, the original jail term is immediately applied in addition to any other sentence.

As of 1 September, 2014, suspended sentences no longer exist in Victoria, and in its place are community correction orders, which can be for a fixed term to ensure good behaviour.

Canada

People's Republic of China

In the People's Republic of China (excluding Hong Kong and Macau), both suspended sentences and suspended sentencing (also translated as a sentence "with reprieve") are featured in the criminal law. In the first situation, a fixed-term sentence of three years or below can be suspended. In the second situation, sentencing does not immediately follow the guilty verdict, but instead is determined after a period of probation.

Death sentences can also be suspended (called a "death sentence with reprieve"), so that an offender who does not intentionally re-offend during the two-year suspension period of release would have the sentence commuted to a life sentence.

Finland
A suspended sentence is called  in Finnish, which translates to "conditional imprisonment". When a sentence of imprisonment, which can be at most two years, is imposed conditionally, the enforcement of the sentence is postponed for a probation period. The length of the probation period is at least one and at most three years. The probation period begins at the pronouncement or the issue of the judgment. When conditional imprisonment is imposed, the convicted person shall be notified, in connection with the pronouncement or the issue of the judgment, of the date when the probation period ends and of the grounds on which the sentence may be ordered to be enforced. A sentence of conditional imprisonment may be combined with fines or, if the sentence is longer than eight months, with community service of at least 14 and up to 120 hours. Additional surveillance of the convicted can also be ordered, if it is seen as necessary to reduce recurrent criminal behaviour. 

The court may order the enforcement of conditional imprisonment if the convicted person commits an offence during the probation period and the charge has been brought within one year of the end of the probation period. In this event, the conditional sentence to be enforced, the sentence for the offence committed during the probation period and the sentences of imprisonment for the other offences considered in the same trial shall be joined as one unconditional sentence of imprisonment. The court may also order that conditional imprisonment be enforced only in part, in which case the remainder of the sentence shall continue to be conditional, subject to the same probation period.

France

The Loi Béranger (Béranger bill) was introduced in March 26, 1891 in the French penal code. It was amended in 1958 and 1983. It allows for three types of suspended sentence:

 sursis simple (simple suspended sentence) – introduced in 1891. The only condition is to not commit any felony for a certain period of time after the final sentencing. Usually this period is 5 years. This can be proscribed to any legal entity, including companies and people.
 sursis probatoire (suspended sentence with probation) – introduced in 1958. this is reserved only to people. It contains checks and balances, and may be combined with other requirements. Before 2020, this was known as sursis probatoire avec mise à l'épreuve.
 sursis assorti avec obligation d'accomplir un travail d'intéret géneral (suspended sentence combined with mandatory community service) – introduced in 1983.

Ireland
In the law of the Republic of Ireland, the 2006 law by which a suspended sentence is activated was ruled unconstitutional in 2016. The 2006 law required that a court decision on whether to activate the suspended sentence be made as soon as a later conviction was handed down, even if there was an appeal pending for the later conviction. Subsequent legislation introduced in 2017 corrected the deficiencies identified, introducing an effective appeal mechanism.

Japan
 are common practice in Japan and can be applied in cases where a sentence is for up to 3 years in prison and/or 500,000 yen in fines. Any criminal activity during the period of the suspended sentence will result in the cancellation of the sentence and imprisonment for the prescribed term.

Russia 
In Russia suspended sentence is commonplace and its application is stipulated by an Article 73 of the Russian Criminal Code. The suspended sentences may not be applied to child offenders (minors aged 14 or less when the offence was committed), to those who have committed a serious or very serious crime (the definition of which is given by Article 15 of the same Code as of 2019), or in case of crime recurrence. The judge may also impose additional restrictions on how the probation must be served. Initial sentence is enforced in case of convicted failing to fulfill conditions of the probation.

United Kingdom
A custodial sentence may, at the discretion of the sentencing judge or magistrates, be suspended for up to two years if the term of imprisonment is under two years and the offender agrees to comply with court requirements, which may include a curfew, performing unpaid work, and/or engaging in an appropriate rehabilitation programme. In 2017, 5% of convictions resulted in a suspended sentence, compared to 7% immediate custodial sentences.

The sentencing guidelines indicate that it is appropriate for a sentence to be suspended if there is strong personal mitigation and/or a realistic prospect of rehabilitation, but suspended sentences should not be used for offenders who pose a risk to the public or who have a history of poor compliance with court orders.

United States
In the United States, it is common practice for judges to hand down suspended sentences to first-time offenders who have committed a minor crime, and for prosecutors to recommend suspended sentences as part of a plea bargain. They are often given to mitigate the effect of penalties.

In some jurisdictions, the criminal record of the guilty party will still carry the offense, even after probation is adequately served. It is important to note that suspending a sentence does not completely remove the conviction from a person's record. While it may be hidden from the public, it is not hidden from law enforcement. In other cases, the process of deferred adjudication prevents the conviction from appearing on a person's criminal record, once probation had been completed.

In the federal system, judges' authority to suspend sentences has been abolished by the Sentencing Reform Act of 1984, through the United States Sentencing Commission, and upheld by Mistretta v. United States.

In military trials governed by the Uniform Code of Military Justice, officers meting out non-judicial punishment may suspend the punishment they order.

See also 
 Deferred sentence

References

Sentencing (law)
Punishments
Probation